Bretz is an unincorporated community in Tucker County, West Virginia, United States. Bretz lies along the Black Fork River between Parsons and Hambleton.

Unincorporated communities in Tucker County, West Virginia
Unincorporated communities in West Virginia